Etelka Gerster (25 June 1855, Košice20 August 1920, Pontecchio) was a Hungarian soprano. She debuted in Italy in 1876 and sang in London the following year.

In 1878, she was performing in the Academy of Music where she was considered one of the leading singers of her time. That year, she married Pietro Gardini.

She and Gardini subsequently had a child, after which Gerster never sang professionally again. From 1896 until 1917, she taught singing in Berlin. Among her students were Ilona Durigo, Therese Schnabel, Matja von Niessen-Stone, and Lotte Lehmann.

Her daughter married Fritz Reiner.

References

Sources 
Enciklopedia Slovenska. II. zväzok. Bratislava, 1978. VEDA
Seeger, Horst: Opernlexikon. 3. ... überarb. ... Aufl. Berlin, 1986. Henschelverlag.

External links

 Etelka Gerster (1855-1920) (Wayback Machine)

 Luminous-Lint on Gerster
Etelka Gerster(Gardini) portrait by Jose Mora

1855 births
1920 deaths
Hungarian operatic sopranos
Musicians from Košice
Place of birth missing
19th-century Hungarian women opera singers